Richard Westmacott (the younger) RA (14 April 1799 – 19 April 1872) – also sometimes described as Richard Westmacott III (to distinguish him from his father and grandfather – both sculptors bearing the same name) – was a prominent English sculptor of the early and mid-19th century.

Life

Born in London, he was the son of Sir Richard Westmacott (1775–1856), and followed closely in his father's footsteps: studying at the Royal Academy (from 1818), being elected as an Associate of the Royal Academy (in 1838) and a full Academician (in 1849), and then succeeding his father to serve as the RA's professor of sculpture (1857–68) – the only time an RA professorship passed from father to son.

Among his most notable works is the pediment of the Royal Exchange in the City of London. Other works include:
 the tomb of Philip Yorke, 3rd Earl of Hardwicke at St Andrew's Church in Wimpole, Cambridgeshire
 monument commemorating Sir John Franklin's lost Arctic expedition of 1845, now in the Chapel sacristy at Greenwich Hospital, south-east London.
 monument for Chief Justice Sampson Salter Blowers at St. Paul's Church, Halifax, Nova Scotia

Westmacott was elected a Fellow of the Royal Society in May 1837, his candidacy citation saying that he was "Richard Westmacott Junr Esqr of 21 Wilton Place Belgrave Square, Sculptor, Author of the Article "Sculpture" in the Encyclopædia Metropolitana, and of various Essays and Articles on Art, and Antiquity, a gentleman devoted to Science in general, and the fine Arts in particular" 

He is commemorated by a memorial in St Mary Abbots church in Kensington, west London.

Works

public works by Westmacott include
Monument to William Burslem, 1820, Worcester Cathedral
Monument to Sacharissa Hibbert, 1828, Exeter Cathedral
Monument to Rev William Pemberton, 1828, Newton, Cambridgeshire
Bust of Sir William Sidney Smith, 1829
Monument to George Pretyman Tomline, Bishop of Winchester, 1830, Winchester Cathedral
Bust of George Tierney, 1830, Westminster Abbey
Monument to Sir Manasseh Masseh Lopes, 1831, Buckleigh Church, Devon
Bust of Davies Gilbert, 1833, Pembroke College, Oxford
Bust of Lord King, 1833, Ockham Church, Surrey
Bust of Rev Sydney Smith, 1835
Bust of Archdeacon Berners, 1839, Wolverstone Church, Suffolk
Bust of Mrs Henry Milman, 1839
Bust of Viscount Fordwich, 1840
Bust of Cardinal Newman, 1841
Busts of Wibraham Egerton and his daughter, 1842, Tatton Park, Cheshire
Bust of Lord John Russell, 1843, Woburn Abbey
Bust of Lord Wriothesley Russell, 1844, Woburn Abbey
Monument to Sir Henry Holland, 1st Baronet, 1844, Wistow, Leicestershire
Bust of Marianne Packe, 1844, Prestwold Church, Leicestershire
Bust of the Marquess of Tavistock, 1844, Woburn Abbey
Bust of Sir Francis Burdett, 1845, collection of Rupert Gunnis
Bust of Sir Roderick Murchison, 1847, Scottish National Portrait Gallery
Bust of the Francis Russell, 7th Duke of Bedford, 1847, Woburn Abbey
Bust of Earl Talbot, 1847
Monument to Archbishop Howley (recumbent figure), 1848, Canterbury Cathedral
Bust of Lord Wharncliffe, 1849
Tomb of Bishop Kaye (recumbent figure), 1857, Lincoln Cathedral

References

Royal Academy profile of Westmacott

External links

 

1799 births
1872 deaths
19th-century British sculptors
19th-century English male artists
British architectural sculptors
British male sculptors
Fellows of the Royal Society
Monumental masons
Royal Academicians
Sculptors from London